Rachel Walker may refer to:

 Rachel Walker (singer) (born 1976), English-born singer of Gaelic folk music
 Rachel Walker (field hockey) (born 1979), English field hockey international
 Rachel Walker Turner (1868–1943), American soprano singer
 Rachel Walker, who appeared on Operation Transformation in 2011

See also
 Rachel v. Walker, a "freedom suit" filed by Rachel, an African-American slave in the St. Louis Circuit Court.